is a professional Japanese baseball player. He plays pitcher for the Chunichi Dragons.

Early life
As a student of Aichi Prefectural Konan High School, as he was only 150cm tall he gave up playing baseball to play as a libero for the school's volleyball team. However, while at high school, Matsuda grew to 175cm and he looked to return to baseball at university. 

In 2016, Matsuda passed the exam to enter the Economics Department of Nagoya University where he joined the baseball club.

On 17 October 2019, Matsuda was selected as the 1st draft pick in the development player round for the Chunichi Dragons at the 2019 NPB Draft and on 11 November signed a development player contract with a ¥2,000,000 moving allowance and a ¥3,000,000 yearly salary.

Pitching style
Matsuda's fastball tops out at 148 km/h which he pairs with a cutter, slider, curveball, change-up and two-seam fastball.

Personal
At University, his black rimmed glasses were his trademark but as he was selected by the Dragons, he upgraded to blue frames. He has said he aspires to be like Masahiro Yamamoto.

References

External links
NPB.jp

1997 births
Living people
Baseball people from Aichi Prefecture
People from Iwakura, Aichi
Japanese baseball players
Nagoya University alumni
Nippon Professional Baseball pitchers
Chunichi Dragons players